Warakapola Divisional Secretariat is a  Divisional Secretariat  of Kegalle District, of Sabaragamuwa Province, Sri Lanka.And it consist of 78 Grama Niladhari divisions.

Grama Niladhari Divisions

References

 Divisional Secretariats Portal

Divisional Secretariats of Kegalle District